Daniel González Vega (born November 8, 1992) is a Mexican footballer who plays as a striker currently with Chapulineros de Oaxaca in Liga Premier de México.

Career 
González Vega began playing in the Liga MX in 2013 with Deportivo Toluca F.C. Throughout his tenure with Toluca he played in the 2013–14 CONCACAF Champions League. In 2014, he was loaned to the Serie A de México with Tlaxcala F.C. In 2015, he was loaned to Chiapas F.C., and later to C.D. Guadalajara Premier. In 2018, he played abroad in the Canadian Soccer League with Scarborough SC.

In 2020, he signed with Chapulineros de Oaxaca in the Liga Premier de México.

References

Living people
1992 births
Mexican expatriate footballers
Association football forwards
Deportivo Toluca F.C. players
Tlaxcala F.C. players
Chiapas F.C. footballers
Potros UAEM footballers
Scarborough SC players
Cafetaleros de Chiapas footballers
Liga MX players
Ascenso MX players
Liga Premier de México players
Canadian Soccer League (1998–present) players
Mexican expatriate sportspeople in Canada
Expatriate soccer players in Canada
Footballers from Coahuila
Mexican footballers
Sportspeople from Torreón
Chapulineros de Oaxaca footballers